Theodore DeReese Pendergrass (March 26, 1950 – January 13, 2010) was an American soul and R&B singer-songwriter. He was born in Kingstree, South Carolina. Pendergrass spent most of his life in the Philadelphia area, and initially rose to musical fame as the lead singer of Harold Melvin & the Blue Notes. After leaving the group in 1976, Pendergrass launched a successful solo career under the Philadelphia International label, releasing five consecutive platinum albums (a record at the time for an African-American R&B artist). Pendergrass's career was suspended after a March 1982 car crash left him paralyzed from the waist down. Pendergrass continued his successful solo career until announcing his retirement in 2007. He died from respiratory failure in January 2010.

Early life
He was born Theodore DeReese Pendergrass on March 26, 1950, in Kingstree, South Carolina. He was the only child of Jesse and Ida Geraldine (née Epps) Pendergrass. Ida suffered six miscarriages before successfully giving birth to Teddy. When Pendergrass was very young, his father left the family. As he grew older, his mother promised him that she would find his father so that they could meet. She fulfilled that promise, and Teddy met his father when he was 11 years old. Not long after, Jesse was stabbed to death on June 13, 1962, during an altercation with another man. He was 47 years of age. Pendergrass grew up in the impoverished section of North Philadelphia and often sang at church. He dreamed of being a pastor and got his wish when, at age 10, he was ordained a minister (according to author Robert Ewell Greene). Pendergrass also took up drums during this time and was a junior deacon of his church.

He attended Thomas Edison High School for Boys in North Philadelphia. He sang with the Edison Mastersingers. He dropped out in the 11th grade to enter the music business, recording his first song "Angel with Muddy Feet". The recording, however, was not a commercial success. Pendergrass played drums for several local Philadelphia bands, eventually becoming the drummer of The Cadillacs (not the famed Harlem-based group of the same name). In 1970, he was spotted by the Blue Notes' founder, Harold Melvin (1939–1997), who convinced Pendergrass to play drums in the group. However, during a performance, Pendergrass began singing along, and Melvin, impressed by his vocals, made him the lead singer. Before Pendergrass joined the group, the Blue Notes had struggled to find success. This all changed when they landed a recording deal with Philadelphia International Records in 1971, thus beginning Pendergrass's successful collaboration with label founders Kenny Gamble and Leon Huff.

Early career

Harold Melvin and the Blue Notes: 1970–1975
In 1972, Harold Melvin and the Blue Notes released their first single, a slow, solemn ballad entitled "I Miss You". The song was originally written for The Dells, but the group passed on it. Noting how Pendergrass sounded like Dells lead singer Marvin Junior, Kenny Gamble decided to build the song with Pendergrass, who was only 21 at the time of the recording. Pendergrass sings much of the song in a raspy baritone voice that would become his trademark. The song also featured Blue Notes member Lloyd Parks singing falsetto in the background and spotlighted Harold Melvin adding in a rap near the end of the song as Pendergrass kept singing, feigning tears. The song, one of Gamble and Huff's most creative productions, became a major rhythm and blues hit and put the Blue Notes on the map. The group's follow-up single, "If You Don't Know Me by Now", brought the group to the mainstream with the song reaching the top 10 of the Billboard Hot 100, while also reaching number one on the soul no. 1 singles chart. Like "I Miss You" before it, the song was originally intended for a different artist, fellow Philadelphian native Patti LaBelle and her group Labelle but the group could not record it due to scheduling conflicts. Pendergrass and LaBelle developed a close friendship that would last until Pendergrass's death.

The group rode to fame with several more releases over the years including "The Love I Lost", a song that predated the upcoming disco music scene, the ballad "Hope That We Can Be Together Soon", and socially conscious singles "Wake Up Everybody" and "Bad Luck". One of the group's notable singles was their original version of the Philly soul classic "Don't Leave Me This Way", which turned into a disco smash when Motown artist Thelma Houston released her version in 1976. By 1975, Pendergrass and Harold Melvin were at odds, mainly over financial issues and personality conflicts. Despite the fact that Pendergrass sang most of the group's songs, Melvin was controlling the group's finances. At one point, Pendergrass wanted the group to be renamed "Teddy Pendergrass and the Blue Notes" because fans kept mistaking him for Melvin. Pendergrass left the group in 1975, and the Blue Notes struggled with his replacements. They eventually left Philadelphia International and toiled in relative obscurity, until Melvin's death in 1997. As of 2014, a version of the group still tours the old school circuit, performing as Harold Melvin's Blue Notes.

Solo career

Early solo success

In 1977, Pendergrass released his self-titled album, which went platinum on the strength of the disco hit "I Don't Love You Anymore". Its follow-up single, "The Whole Town's Laughing at Me", became a top 20 R&B hit. Although not released as singles, the uptempo album tracks "You Can't Hide from Yourself" and "The More I Get, The More I Want", as well as the ballad "And If I Had" were also hits. The debut album was quickly followed by Life Is a Song Worth Singing, in 1978. That album was even more successful with its singles "Only You" and the classic million selling number 1 R&B hit "Close the Door". The latter song firmly established Pendergrass as the top male sex symbol in soul music. The album's popularity was furthered by the disco hit "Get Up, Get Down, Get Funky, Get Loose", the ballad "It Don't Hurt Now", and the mid-tempo classic "When Somebody Loves You Back". That double platinum number-one R&B triumph was followed up in 1979 by two successes, the albums Teddy (which stayed at number 1 on the Billboard R&B chart for eight weeks and was named the second-biggest R&B album of the year), and the live release Live Coast to Coast. Hits off Teddy included the classics "Come Go with Me", the erotic ballad "Turn Off the Lights", and the uptempo album cut "Do Me". With his sex appeal at an all-time high after his 1979 tour, Pendergrass took a more mellow approach on his 1980 album TP. It included the classic number two R&B hit "Love TKO", the Stephanie Mills duet version of "Feel the Fire" and the Ashford & Simpson composition "Is It Still Good to You". Between 1977 and 1981, Pendergrass landed five consecutive platinum albums, which was a then record-setting number for a rhythm and blues artist.

Pendergrass's popularity became massive at the end of 1978. With sold-out audiences packing his shows, his manager – the renowned Shep Gordon, who was known for his innovative approaches to publicizing his artists – soon noticed that a huge number of his audience consisted of women of all races. Gordon devised a plan for Pendergrass's next tour to play to just female audiences, starting a trend that continues today called "women-only concerts". With four platinum albums and two gold albums, Pendergrass was on his way to being what the media called "the black Elvis", not only in terms of his crossover popularity but also due to him buying a mansion akin to Elvis's Graceland, located just outside his hometown of Philadelphia. By early 1982, Pendergrass was perhaps the leading R&B male artist of his day, equaling the popularity of Marvin Gaye, and surpassing Barry White and all others in the R&B field. In 1980, the Isley Brothers released "Don't Say Goodnight (It's Time for Love)" to compete with Pendergrass's "Turn Off the Lights", which sensed Pendergrass's influence on the quiet storm format of black music.

Car crash
On March 18, 1982, in the East Falls section of Philadelphia on Lincoln Drive near Rittenhouse Street, Pendergrass was involved in a car crash while driving his new Rolls-Royce Silver Spirit. At the time of the accident, Pendergrass was reportedly driving Tenika Watson, a transgender woman he had known since the 1970s, to her house. It appeared to Watson that the cause of the crash was a mechanical error in the car, and that possibly someone had tampered with the brakes.  Watson attested to the fact that Pendergrass was sober and uncomprehending as to why the brakes did not function. The car hit a guard rail, crossed onto the oncoming lane, and hit two trees. No other cars were involved. The two were trapped in the wreckage for 45 minutes before they were freed by emergency response services. While Watson walked away from the collision with minor injuries, Pendergrass had a spinal cord injury, leaving him a tetraplegic, paralyzed from the chest down; he never walked again.

Later solo career
Pendergrass got well-wishes from thousands of his fans during his recovery. In August 1982, Philadelphia International released This One's for You, which failed to chart successfully, as did 1983's Heaven Only Knows. Both albums included material Pendergrass had recorded before the crash. The albums completed his contract with Philadelphia International. By the time Pendergrass decided to return to the studio to work on new music he had struggled to find a recording deal. Eventually signing a contract with Asylum Records and completing physical therapy, he released Love Language in 1984. The album included the pop ballad "Hold Me", featuring a then-unknown Whitney Houston. It reached No. 38 on the Billboard album chart and was certified Gold by the RIAA.

On July 13, 1985, Pendergrass made an emotional return to the stage at the historic Live Aid concert in Philadelphia in front of a live audience of over 100,000, the concert having an estimated 1.5 billion television viewers. It was the 35-year-old's first live performance following the accident. Pendergrass tearfully thanked the audience for keeping him in their well-wishes and then performed the Diana Ross song "Reach Out and Touch (Somebody's Hand)". In 1988, Pendergrass scored his first R&B number-one hit in nearly a decade when the song "Joy", from his album of the same name, was released. A video of the song enjoyed heavy rotation on BET. It was also his final Hot 100 charted single, peaking at number 77. The album was certified Gold by the RIAA that same year. Also, Pendergrass's voice was heard on the jingles of a then local Philadelphia radio station, WSNI-FM. Pendergrass kept recording through the 1990s. One of the singer's last hits was the new jack swing song, "Believe in Love", released in 1994. In 1996, he starred alongside Stephanie Mills in the touring production of the gospel musical Your Arms Too Short to Box with God. In 1998, Pendergrass released his autobiography entitled Truly Blessed.

Pendergrass did a concert at the Wiltern Theater in Los Angeles on February 14, 2002, entitled "The Power of Love". The concert became the album From Teddy, With Love, which was released on the Razor & Tie record label later that year. It was his second (after Live! Coast to Coast) and final live album. Clips of the concert, in particular his performance of his comeback song "Joy" can still be seen on YouTube. In his later years, Pendergrass's "Wake Up Everybody" has been covered by a diverse range of acts from Simply Red to Patti LaBelle and was chosen as a rallying cry during the 2004 Presidential campaign by Kenneth "Babyface" Edmonds to mobilize voters. In addition, Little Brother, Kanye West, Cam'ron, Twista, Ghostface, Tyrese Gibson, 9th Wonder, DMX and DJ Green Lantern have utilized his works.

In 2006, Pendergrass announced his retirement from the music business. In 2007, he briefly returned to performing to participate in Teddy 25: A Celebration of Life, Hope & Possibilities, a 25th anniversary awards ceremony that marked Pendergrass's crash, but also raised money for his charity, The Teddy Pendergrass Alliance, and honored those who helped Pendergrass since the accident.

Personal life and death

Pendergrass had three children: Tisha, LaDonna, and Theodore Jr.

Pendergrass's manager and girlfriend Taazmayia "Taaz" Lang was shot dead on the doorstep of her home in April 1977. The murder remains unsolved, although Philadelphia's Black Mafia has been suspected, as they allegedly resented Lang's control over Pendergrass's lucrative career.

In June 1987, Pendergrass married a former Philadanco dancer named Karen Still, who had also danced in his shows. They divorced in 2002.

Pendergrass published his autobiography, Truly Blessed, with Patricia Romanowski in 1998.

In the spring of 2006, Pendergrass met Joan Williams. He proposed to her after four months, and they married in a private ceremony officiated by his pastor, Alyn Waller of Enon Tabernacle Baptist Church, on Easter Sunday, March 23, 2008. A formal wedding was celebrated at The Ocean Cliff Resort in Newport, Rhode Island, on September 6, 2008. As members of Enon Tabernacle Baptist Church, Joan Pendergrass set up The Enon Tabernacle Baptist Church Youth Fund in the name of Pendergrass to provide assistance and a center for Philadelphia's inner city youth.

On June 5, 2009, Pendergrass underwent successful surgery for colon cancer and returned home to recover. A few weeks later he returned to the hospital with respiratory issues. After seven months, he died of respiratory failure on January 13, 2010, with his wife Joan by his side, at Bryn Mawr Hospital in Bryn Mawr, Pennsylvania. He was 59. His body was interred at the West Laurel Hill Cemetery in Bala Cynwyd, Pennsylvania.

As of 2015 there are plans to make a feature film biopic of Pendergrass's life, and Tyrese Gibson is set to star as the late singer.

In 2019, BBC Film made a documentary on Pendergrass's life titled If You Don't Know Me. It was released February 8 on Showtime.

Discography

 Teddy Pendergrass (1977)
 Life Is a Song Worth Singing (1978)
 Teddy (1979)
 TP (1980)
 It's Time for Love (1981)
 This One's for You (1982)
 Heaven Only Knows (1983)
 Love Language (1984)
 Workin' It Back (1985)
 Joy (1988)
 Truly Blessed (1991)
 A Little More Magic (1993)
 You and I (1997)
 This Christmas (I'd Rather Have Love) (1998)

Awards and honors

Grammy Award nominations
Pendergrass received five Grammy Award nominations.

Other awards
Pendergrass received several nominations for the American Music Awards between 1979 and 1981 for Favorite Soul/R&B Male Artist, Favorite Soul/R&B Album, and Favorite Disco Artist. He won the AMA for Favorite Soul/R&B Male Artist in 1979, tied with singer Lou Rawls. Pendergrass was posthumously inducted into the National Rhythm & Blues Hall of Fame class of 2021.

References

External links
 Official site
 
 Teddy Pendergrass at Legacy Recordings
 
 
 "Teddy Pendergrass" – Daily Telegraph obituary, January 14, 2010.

1950 births
2010 deaths
American baritones
American dance musicians
American soul singers
Deaths from cancer in Pennsylvania
Culture of Philadelphia
Deaths from colorectal cancer
Deaths from respiratory failure
Musicians from Philadelphia
People with paraplegia
Philadelphia International Records artists
Harold Melvin & the Blue Notes members
Burials at West Laurel Hill Cemetery
Singers from Pennsylvania
American funk singers
American disco singers
American rhythm and blues singers
20th-century African-American male singers
21st-century African-American male singers